Summer Snow is a Japanese television drama that was broadcast from July 7 to September 15, 2000, on TBS. It is a love story between a young man who has been forced to grow up too quickly, and a young woman with an activity-restricting ailment. The title refers to marine snow, which the two promise to see together one day. The series comprises eleven episodes.

Summary
Natsuo (Domoto Tsuyoshi) has been looking after his younger brother Jun and sister Chika since the death of their parents. He has also been running the family bicycle shop. Yuki (Hirosue Ryōko) becomes the only person in the world in whom he can confide. For Yuki, Natsuo becomes the catalyst that has her trying to break out of her cocoon.

Cast
Tsuyoshi Domoto - Shinoda Natsuo
Ryōko Hirosue - Katase Yuki
Tsubasa Imai - Suetsugu Hiroto
Ikewaki Chizuru - Shinoda Chika
Shunsuke Nakamura - Tachibana Seiji
Kadono Takuzo - Katase Shogo
Hideko Hara - Sakurai Miyako
Shun Oguri - Shinoda Jun

Songs and theme songs
"Natsuno Osama" by KinKi Kids
"Summer Snow" by Sissel and Zamfir
"Seven Angels" by Sissel

Summer Snow (song)

"Summer Snow" was released as a single by the Norwegian soprano Sissel Kyrkjebø and Zamfir in 2000. It is based on the traditional song "The Water Is Wide". The single also includes the song "Seven Angels" with Sissel and Zamfir.

References

External links 
Summer Snow on IMDb

Japanese drama television series
2000 Japanese television series debuts
2000 Japanese television series endings
TBS Television (Japan) dramas